Iridium hexafluoride, also iridium(VI) fluoride, (IrF6) is a compound of iridium and fluorine and one of the seventeen known binary hexafluorides. It is one of only a few compounds with iridium in the oxidation state +6.

Synthesis 
Iridium hexafluoride is made by a direct reaction of iridium metal in an excess of elemental fluorine gas at 300 °C. However, it is thermally unstable and must be frozen out of the gaseous reaction mixture to avoid dissociation.

 + 3  →

Description 
Iridium hexafluoride is a yellow crystalline solid that melts at 44 °C and boils at 53.6 °C. The solid structure measured at −140 °C is orthorhombic space group Pnma. Lattice parameters are a = 9.411 Å, b = 8.547 Å, and c = 4.952 Å. There are four formula units (in this case, discrete molecules) per unit cell, giving a density of 5.11 g·cm−3.

The IrF6 molecule itself (the form important for the liquid or gas phase) has octahedral molecular geometry, which has point group (Oh).  The Ir–F bond length is 1.833 Å.

It reacts with fluorine at 39 GPa to form iridium octafluoride, IrF8, according to calculation.

References

Further reading 
 Gmelins Handbuch der anorganischen Chemie, System Nr. 67, Iridium, Supplement Volume 2, pp. 99–102.

External links 
 Iridium hexafluoride at webelements.com.

Iridium compounds
Hexafluorides
Platinum group halides
Octahedral compounds